The siege of Haguenau (27 September 1705 – 5 October 1705) was a siege of the War of the Spanish Succession. An Imperial army under the command of Field Marshal Johann Karl von Thüngen, besieged and captured the French fortified city of Haguenau on the banks of the Rhine river in Alsace.

While the main Allied army under the Duke of Marlborough was operating against French in the Spanish Netherlands, a French army under Marshal Claude de Villars in Alsace captured Wissembourg in early July and attempted to dislodge the Imperials from their position near Lauterbourg; but the attempt was beaten off by the Imperial Field Marshal Johann Karl von Thüngen who had taken over from the ill Louis William, Margrave of Baden-Baden.

A French detachment captured Homburg on 27 July, the Palatinate garrison agreeing to retire to Mannheim. On 28 August, the Imperial forces, now commanded by the Margrave of Baden and reinforced by 16,000 Prussian and Palatinate troops in 10 Prussian infantry battalions and 20 cavalry squadrons, breached the Lines of Haguenau, a French line of field fortifications, advanced into Lower Alsace and laid siege, first to Drusenheim and then to Haguenau on 27 September, the latter falling on 5 October. After a slender resistance, the French garrison offered to surrender with conditions but was rebuffed by Thüngen, who demanded their imprisonment. Leaving 400 men and the sick and wounded inside to distract the Allies, the French governor Peri escaped Haguenau under the cover of night toward Saverne with some 2,000 of his troops, the incomplete Imperial investment of 20 squadrons of Prussian and Württemberger infantry failing to stop them. The 400-strong detachment escaped soon after. Louis of Baden was outraged by this failure. The sieges concluded the campaign season, the opposing armies withdrawing to winter quarters later that month. The Imperials had established a bridgehead across the Rhine.

References

Citations

Bibliography
 
 

Siege of Hagenau
Sieges involving France
Sieges involving the Holy Roman Empire
Sieges involving Prussia
Sieges of the War of the Spanish Succession
Battles of the War of the Spanish Succession